The men's Olympic beach volleyball tournament at the 2008 Summer Olympics in Beijing took place at the Beach Volleyball Ground at Chaoyang Park from August 9 to August 22.

Each of the 24 pairs in the tournament was placed in one of six groups of four teams apiece, and played a round-robin within that pool. The top two teams in each pool advanced to the Round of 16. The six third-place teams were ranked against each other, with ties being broken by the ratio of points won to lost. The best two advanced to the Round of 16, while the other four played two matches (#3 vs. #6 and #4 vs. #5) with the winners of those two matches advancing as well. The losers of those matches, along with the fourth-place teams in each group, were eliminated.

The 16 teams that advanced to the elimination rounds played a single-elimination tournament with a bronze medal match between the semifinal losers.

Qualification

The top eight finishes that a team had from January 1, 2007, to July 20, 2008, on the Swatch FIVB World Tour (2007 and 2008), SWATCH FIVB World Championships (2007) and on FIVB recognised Continental Championship Finals, counted towards Olympic qualification for the Beijing 2008 Olympic Games.

There were 24 teams competing at the Olympic Games, with a maximum of two teams per country.

Brazil had four teams in the top 10 of the FIVB Beach Volleyball Olympic Ranking, but only two teams from each country could participate in the Olympic Games. Also Germany, the USA, and the Netherlands had three teams each in the top 24.

Qualifiers
The official cut off date for Olympic qualification for beach volleyball was July 20, 2008. The final Olympic Qualification Ranking for the 24 teams, was announced confirmed by the FIVB on July 24, 2008.

If the host nation had a team in the top 6 teams on the FIVB Olympic ranking when the Olympic Games began, it was automatically seeded as #1; therefore China's team Xu - Wu (ranked as #5 on the Olympic ranking,) was seeded as #1. Accordingly, the #1 ranked Rogers - Dalhausser, was seeded as #2, Ricardo - Emanuel as #3, M. Araújo - Fabio Luiz as #4 and Nummerdor - Schuil as #5.

The Brazilian team Harley - Pedro, was placed as #5 on the Olympic ranking, but did not qualify because of the two teams per country rule. Harley - Pedro was ranked as #2 on the World ranking per July 21, 2008, and #1 per August 4, 2008.

* Matteo Varnier is replaced by Eugenio Amore on the Italian team, because of  an injury to Varnier.

Participating nations

Preliminary round
The two best teams from each group advanced to the quarterfinal round.

The composition of the preliminary rounds was announced confirmed on April 16, 2008.

The #1 seeded team was placed in pool A, #2 in pool B, #3 in C, #4 in D, #5 in E, and #6 in F. But if the host nation had a team in the top 6 teams, it was automatically seeded as #1. Therefore, China's team Xu-Wu (ranked as #5,) is placed in pool A.

There was held a draw of lots between seed #7 - #9, between #10 - #12, between #13 - #18, and between #19 - #24. The Drawing of lots was hosted by the 1 to 1 Energy Grand Slam, in Gstaad on July 26, as part of the 2008 SWATCH FIVB Beach Volleyball World Tour.

A team received 2 points for each match won, and 1 point for each match lost.

After the preliminary rounds, from August 9–14, 2008, the teams placed 1st and 2nd in each pool had qualified for the playoffs. The two best 3rd placed teams had also qualified. Two Lucky Loser matches qualified two more of the 3rd placed teams. The two 3rd placed teams that lost their Lucky Losers match, were out of the competition. Also out of the competition were teams placed 4th in their pool.

All times are China Standard Time (UTC+8)

Pool A

Pool B

Pool C

Pool D

Pool E

Pool F

Lucky loser

Of the 6 teams that are placed third in their pools, two are directly qualified to the playoffs. Of the four remaining third placed teams, another two teams get to the playoffs through winning a Lucky Loser match.

3rd placed teams
This table shows the results of the third placed teams after the pool play, and before the Lucky Loser matches.

Lucky Loser
Results of the Lucky Loser matches only.

Playoffs

Round of 16

Overview

Quarterfinals

Semifinals

Bronze medal match

Gold medal match

Award ceremony
12:10, Aug 22, 2008

Final ranking
If the host nation has a team in the top 6 teams on the FIVB Olympic ranking when the Olympic Games begin, it is automatically seeded as #1. Therefore, China's team Xu - Wu (ranked as #5 on the FIVB Olympic ranking,) was seeded as #1 before the Games.

See also
Beach volleyball at the 2008 Summer Olympics – Women's tournament

References

Current Standing Olympic Beach Volleyball Qualification Men at the FIVB official page
Beach Volleyball - Schedules & Results, the official website of the Beijing 2008 Olympic Games
 Competition format

External links
 BeachVolley at the FIVB official page
 Beach Volleyball at the official website of the Beijing 2008 Olympic Games

O
2008
Men's beach tournament
Men's events at the 2008 Summer Olympics